The WEBN Stakes is a race for Thoroughbred race horses.  It is held in February at Turfway Park. The WEBN Stakes is open to three-year-olds willing to race one mile on the dirt.  The race is an ungraded stakes with a purse of $50,000.

This race was formally called the Presidents Stakes.  In 2009, the race was postponed a week due to unseasonable weather.

Past winners

 2012 - Mr. Prankster (John McKee)
 2011 -
 2010 - Kera's Kitten (Thomas L. Pompell)
 2009 - Parade Clown (Bill Troilo)
 2008 - Big Glen (James Lopez)
 2007 - Joe Got Even (Miguel Mena)
 2006 - Warrior Within (Dean Sarvis)
 2005 - Snack (Ramsey Zimmerman)
 2004 - Silver Minister (Rafael Bejarano)
 2003 - Champali (Jason Lumpkins)
 2002 - Request for Parole (Perfect Drift placed.)

External links
 Turfway Park official site

Horse races in Kentucky
Triple Crown Prep Races